Fighting for Love is a 2001 Hong Kong romantic comedy film written and directed by Joe Ma and starring Tony Leung and Sammi Cheng.

Plot 

Deborah (Sammi Cheng) is a tough modern businesswoman whose primary traits seem to be chain smoking and bullying her colleagues. While going to the hospital one day to visit her sister, she manages to sideswipe Veg Cheung's (Tony Leung Chiu-wai) car; seeing this she immediately drives off.

Veg, owner of a beef noodle stall, Gat Lee, wants to pursue her but changes his mind when his sick mother demands to be brought to the hospital immediately. It so happens that he sees her car again at the hospital; when she denies breaking his mirror, he kicks her door in and they have a childish quarrel in which the police end up being called.

Advising them to settle the matter privately, Deborah agrees to meet Veg at a karaoke lounge and after they get drunk, they have what they think at the time will be a one-night stand.

Unbeknownst to Deborah, Veg actually has a girlfriend, Mindy (Niki Chow), who is also a popular television talk show host. In a series of events that go from bad to worse, Deborah then gets fired from her job for her boss, Hing Chan's wife, Bobo's mishandling of a contract, and then gets kicked out of her parents house where she has been staying, after her losing of the family dog triggers off an argument.

With nowhere to go, Deborah ends up sleeping in the hospital next to her sister, where she meets Veg, who is visiting his mother. After hearing about her predicament, Veg invites her to his home to shower, and she meets his dysfunctional family; two sisters who are always arguing, and a brother, Gary, who is continually in fear of them. His family makes a big deal out of Deborah, continually praising Mindy, and unable to take it, Veg and Deborah leave and go for a walk.

At the beef noodle shop, Deborah starts working for Veg, but she also manages to spoil the secret recipe of 30 years of work. They have to go to a rival restaurant instead to buy the bull organs.

While accompanying Veg's mother on a morning jog, she is advised against competing against Mindy for Veg. She also manages to accidentally cut Veg's mother.

Veg goes to Deborah's old office acting as a gangster to demand her pay cheque. He gives the company $50000 and asks them to issue a cheque to her for that amount. Upon hearing that Deborah has been paid, Veg's mother insists she give them a treat. While they are deciding where to go, the whole family excitedly tells Veg that Mindy is coming back from her overseas shoot the next day.

After their dinner, Deborah sees her ex colleagues and apologises for her previous behaviour.

Mindy announces to Veg that she wants to marry him and that she will change everything she is to be with him. Unable to break up with her in the face of this information, he lets himself be swayed to purchase engagement rings instead. He calls Deborah and tells her that their relationship is the one that has to end instead.

A former colleague invites Deborah to a staff party and Veg shows up holding flowers; Deborah thinks these are for her, but the truth is Mindy happens to be the MC for the staff party. Both Veg and Deborah hide from her but in an ultimate showdown, Mindy and Deborah have a big fight, and Veg realises that his true love is in fact Deborah.

Cast 
 Tony Leung Chiu-wai as Veg Cheung
 Sammi Cheng as Deborah Fok
 Niki Chow as Mindy
 Teresa Ha as Veg's mother
 Sammy Leung as Kelvin
 Joe Lee as Camel
 Alan Mak as Officer Mak
 Juanita Cheng as Veg's sister
 Lee Fung as Veg's mother
 Winston Yip as Deborah's father
 Chan Man-lei as Uncle Lui
 Ben Yuen as Hing Chan

Accolades

References

External links 
 IMDb entry
 LoveHKFilm Review

2001 films
2001 romantic comedy films
Hong Kong romantic comedy films
2000s Cantonese-language films
Films directed by Joe Ma
Films set in Hong Kong
Films shot in Hong Kong
2000s Hong Kong films